Carex camposii is a tussock-forming species of perennial sedge in the family Cyperaceae. It is native to parts of Spain.

See also
List of Carex species

References

camposii
Taxa named by Pierre Edmond Boissier
Plants described in 1852
Flora of Spain